Sahneuti (also spelled Shahnyaati, Sahnyateh, Sanytyi, Senati, Sinate), died c.1900 was a Gwich'in First Nation chief and a fur trader.

After the establishment of the Hudson's Bay Company trading post at Fort Yukon in 1847, Alexander Hunter Murray appointed him Chief Trader. Following the expulsion of the Hudson's Bay Company from Fort Yukon in 1869 after the Alaska Purchase, he attempted to trade with the Americans, but dissatisfaction led him to lead a raid on Fort Yukon. Eventually, the Alaska Commercial Company put him in charge of their trade at Fort Yukon. Nevertheless, he kept good relations with the Hudson's Bay Company, playing off the two companies to ensure maximum advantage for his people.

He is the namesake of Senati, Alaska, an area of the middle Yukon River that was settled by the Gwichyaa Gwich’in.

References

External links 
Biography at the Dictionary of Canadian Biography Online

19th-century Native Americans
Alaskan Athabaskan people
Canadian fur traders
Gwich'in people
History of Yukon
Indigenous leaders in Yukon
Year of death missing
Year of birth missing